Sahroni (born September 20, 1985) is an Indonesian footballer who currently plays for Villa 2000 in the Liga Indonesia Premier Division.

Club statistics

References

External links

1982 births
Association football defenders
Living people
Indonesian footballers
Liga 1 (Indonesia) players
Persija Jakarta players
PSMS Medan players
Indonesian Premier Division players
Persih Tembilahan players
People from Tangerang
Sportspeople from Banten